Pathai is a town in Jonglei state, South Sudan approximately  away from Juba, the capital city of South Sudan.

References

Populated places in South Sudan